Drama is a 2010 Chilean drama film directed by Matias Lira.

Plot 
Mateo, Ángel, and María are three young theater students influenced by their professor, Dante. They carry out the "Artodian" technique created by the Frenchman Antonin Artaud, seeking a real reaction such as pain and suffering, and they are sent to the streets to seek experiences that they will later represent in class.

Cast 
 Eusebio Arenas - Mateo
  - María
  - Ángel
 Jaime McManus - Dante
  - Johnny
 Alejandro Goic - Padre
 Fernanda Urrejola - Madre
 Benjamín Vicuña - Max
  - Romeo
 Alejandro Trejo - Don Tonny

References

External links 

2010 drama films
2010 films
Chilean drama films
2010s Chilean films
2010s Spanish-language films